Basic Latin may refer to:

Script
 Basic Latin (Unicode block), a Unicode block
 ISO basic Latin alphabet, a Latin-script alphabet supported in ASCII, ISO/IEC 646 and Unicode, containing the letters of the Unicode block

It may also refer to:
 ASCII, a US 7-bit encoding system, first standardized in 1963
 ISO/IEC 646, an early 7-bit encoding system, based on ASCII and first standardized in 1972

Language
It may also refer to the knowledge of a basic Latin language.

See also
 Latin characters in Unicode